Tulio Manuel Chirivella Varela (14 November 1932 – 10 April 2021) was a Venezuelan Roman Catholic archbishop.

Biography
Chirivella Valera was born in Venezuela and was ordained to the priesthood in 1956. He served as bishop of the Roman Catholic Diocese of Margarita, Venezuela, from 1974 to 1982 and as archbishop of the Roman Catholic Archdiocese of Barquisimeto, Venezuela, from 1982 to 2007. He was appointed Apostolic Administrator of the Archdiocese of Maracaibo by John Paul II on June 28, 1999, a position he held until 2001.

On December 22, 2007, Pope Benedict XVI took office.

He gave up his position due to age-related reasons. Monsignor Antonio José López Castillo succeeded him. After his retirement, he settled in Miami, United States, until his death from COVID-19 on 10 April 2021, at the age of 88.

Notes

1932 births
2021 deaths
Deaths from the COVID-19 pandemic in Florida
20th-century Roman Catholic archbishops in Venezuela
21st-century Roman Catholic archbishops in Venezuela
Roman Catholic bishops of Margarita
Roman Catholic archbishops of Barquisimeto
Venezuelan Roman Catholic archbishops